Bleecker Street is a street in Greenwich Village, New York City.

Bleecker Street may also refer to:

 Bleecker Street (IRT Lexington Avenue Line), a subway station
 Bleecker Street Line
 Bleecker Street Cinemas
 "Bleecker Street", a song on the Simon and Garfunkel album Wednesday Morning, 3 A.M.
 Bleecker Street (IRT Sixth Avenue Line), a former elevated station
 Bleecker Street (company), film studio
 The Saint of Bleecker Street, an opera by American composer Gian Carlo Menotti